The 1997 Meath Senior Football Championship was the 105th edition of the Meath GAA's premier club Gaelic football tournament for senior graded teams in County Meath, Ireland. The tournament consists of 18 teams, with the winner going on to represent Meath in the Leinster Senior Club Football Championship. The championship starts with a group stage and then progresses to a knock out stage.  
 
Kilmainhamwood were the defending champions after they defeated Seneschalstown in the previous years final.

This was Cortown's first ever year as a senior club after claiming the 1996 IFC title.

The first ever 'Navan El Classico' in the SFC took place this year between Navan O'Mahonys and Simonstown Gaels on 27 September in Páirc Tailteann. O'Mahonys won a dour affair and hence qualified for the final.

On 12 October 1997, Navan O'Mahonys claimed their 16th Senior Championship title with a win over Trim in the final. Alan Reilly raised the Keegan Cup for O'Mahonys while Donal Smyth collected the 'Man of the Match' award.

Team changes

The following teams have changed division since the 1996 championship season.

To S.F.C.
Promoted from I.F.C.
 Cortown  -  (Intermediate Champions)

From S.F.C.
Regraded to I.F.C.
 St. Colmcille's

Group stage

Group A

Round 1:
 Navan O'Mahonys 1-9, 1-8 Cortown, Dunderry, 5/4/1997,
 Kilmainhamwood 0-10, 1-6 St. Michael's, Castletown, 5/4/1997,
 Oldcastle 1-7, 0-8 Ballinlough, Kells, 5/4/1997,

Round 2:
 Oldcastle 2-14, 0-9 St. Michael's, Kells, 19/4/1997,
 Navan O'Mahonys 1-11, 0-10 Kilmainhamwood, Carlanstown, 20/4/1997,
 Cortown 0–11, 0-11 Ballinlough, Kells, 20/4/2997,

Round 3:
 Cortown 1-15, 0-10 St. Michael's, Carnaross, 3/5/1997,
 Navan O'Mahonys 0-7, 0-6 Ballinlough, Kells, 4/5/1997,
 Kilmainhamwood 0-10, 0-9 Oldcastle, Kells, 18/5/1997,
                       
Round 4:
 Cortown 0-11, 0-9 Kilmainhamwood, Kells, 14/6/1997,
 Ballinlough 1-14, 2-9 St. Michael's, Carnaross, 18/6/1997,
 Navan O'Mahonys 0-9, 0-7 Oldcastle, Athboy, 20/6/1997,

Round 5:
 Cortown 1-10, 0-8 Oldcastle, Kilskyre, 23/8/1997,
 Kilmainhamwood 1-15, 1-7 Ballinlough, Kells, 23/8/1997,
 Navan O'Mahonys w/o, scr St. Michael's,

Group B

Round 1:
 Summerhill 1-15, 1-9 Seneschalstown, Skryne, 5/4/1997,
 Dunderry 3-11, 1-11 Carnaross, Kells, 6/4/1997,
 Walterstown 0-11, 0-10 Trim, Kilmessan, 6/4/1997,

Round 2:
 Trim 0-13, 0-5 Dunderry, Pairc Tailteann, 20/4/1997,
 Summerhill 0-13, 1-8 Carnaross, Athboy, 20/4/1997,
 Seneschalstown 0-10, 1-3 Walterstown, Pairc Tailteann, 20/4/1997,

Round 3:
 Seneschalstown 4-9, 0-10 Carnaross, Pairc Tailteann, 4/5/1997,
 Dunderry 0-10, 1-6 Walterstown, Pairc Tailteann, 18/5/1997,
 Trim 0-13, 1-7 Summerhill, Longwood, 21/5/1997,
                       
Round 4:
 Walterstown w, l Carnaross, Martry, 23/8/1997,
 Summerhill 0–10, 0-10 Dunderry, Pairc Tailteann, 24/8/1997,
 Trim 0-18, 3-8 Seneschalstown, Pairc Tailteann, 31/8/1997,

Round 5:
 Walterstown 1-10, 0-9 Summerhill, Dunshaughlin, 31/8/1997,
 Seneschalstown 0-17, 2-8 Dunderry, Pairc Tailteann, 7/9/1997,
 Trim 1-12, 1-10 Carnaross, Athboy, 7/9/1997,

Quarter-Final Playoff:
 Seneschalstown1-14, 0-8 Walterstown, Pairc Tailteann, 14/9/1997,

Group C

Round 1:
 St. Peter's Dunboyne 0-11, 1-6 Slane, Walterstown, 5/4/1997,
 Simonstown Gaels 1-10, 1-9 Skryne, Seneschalstown, 6/4/1997,
 Gaeil Colmcille 0-11, 0-3 Moynalvey, Trim, 6/4/1997,

Round 2:
 Simonstown Gaels 3-9, 0-8 St. Peter's Dunboyne, Dunshaughlin, 19/4/1997,
 Skryne 2-9, 1-11 Gaeil Colmcille, Pairc Tailteann, 20/4/1997,
 Slane 0-10, 1-6 Moynalvey, Walterstown, 6/4/1997,

Round 3:
 Gaeil Colmcille 1-7, 0-9 St. Peter's Dunboyne, Pairc Tailteann, 4/5/1997,
 Simonstown Gaels 1-7, 0-8 Slane, Rathkenny, 17/5/1997,
 Skryne w, l Moynalvey, Dunboyne, 17/5/1997,
                       
Round 4:
 Simonstown Gaels 0-17, 0-7 Moynalvey, Skryne, 20/6/1997,
 Gaeil Colmcille 2-10, 0-10 Slane, Castletown, 28/6/1997,
 Skryne 1–10, 2-7 St. Peter's Dunboyne, Dunshaughlin, 23/8/1997,

Round 5:
 Gaeil Colmcille 1-15, 0-10 Simonstown Gaels, Athboy, 24/8/1997,
 St. Peter's Dunboyne w/o, scr Moynalvey,
 Skryne w/o, scr Slane,

Knock-out Stage

Finals

Quarter-Final:
 Cortown 0-8, 1-4 Gaeil Colmcille, Pairc Tailteann, 31/8/1997,
 Simonstown Gaels 0-15, 0-6 Seneschalstown, Pairc Tailteann, 21/9/1997,

Semi-Final:
 Trim 0-17, 0-13 Cortown, Pairc Tailteann, 21/9/1997,
 Navan O'Mahonys 1-8, 0-9 Simonstown Gaels, Pairc Tailteann, 27/9/1997,

Final:
 Navan O'Mahonys 1-10, 0-7 Trim, Pairc Tailteann, 12/10/1997,

Leinster Senior Club Football Championship
Quarter Final:
 Rathnew 1–6, 0-9 Navan O'Mahonys, Aughrim, 8/11/1997,
 Navan O'Mahonys 0–9, 1-8 Rathnew, Pairc Tailteann, 15/11/2997,

References

External links

Meath Senior Football Championship
Meath Senior Football Championship